Poplar South (strictly South Poplar, although this is an unusual form of official name for a borough constituency) was a parliamentary constituency centred on the Poplar district of the East End of London.  It returned one Member of Parliament (MP)  to the House of Commons of the Parliament of the United Kingdom.

The constituency was created for the 1918 general election, and abolished for the 1950 general election.  It was then largely replaced by a new Poplar constituency.

Boundaries

The Borough of Poplar wards of Bromley Central, Bromley South East, Poplar Cubitt Town, Poplar East, Poplar Millwall, Poplar North West, and Poplar West.

Members of Parliament

Election results

Elections in the 1910s

Elections in the 1920s

Elections in the 1930s

Elections in the 1940s

References 

 

Parliamentary constituencies in London (historic)
Constituencies of the Parliament of the United Kingdom established in 1918
Constituencies of the Parliament of the United Kingdom disestablished in 1950
Politics of the London Borough of Tower Hamlets